Michael Corenblith (born 1951) is an art director and production designer. He was nominated for two Academy Awards in the category for Best Art Direction.

Selected filmography
 Apollo 13 (1995)
 How the Grinch Stole Christmas (2000)

References

External links

1951 births
Living people
American art directors
American production designers
Artists from Houston
Best Production Design BAFTA Award winners
Emmy Award winners